Monmouth County, New Jersey has had sheriffs since colonial era, when it was part of East Jersey and later was the Province of New Jersey.

After the Dutch surrender of New Netherland, Colonel Richard Nicolls, an English military officer, was authorized to establish the Monmouth Tract, which he did on April 8, 1665, and instituted a legal system centered on English common law During a brief period of control by the Dutch in 1673, a sheriff would be known as a schout.

"An Act to Appoint Sheriffs", was approved by the Legislature of East New Jersey on March 1, 1682. Terms were for a single year with a maximum of three consecutive terms.

Pursuant to Article VII Section II of the 1947 New Jersey State Constitution, each county in New Jersey is required to have three elected administrative officials known as "constitutional officers": the County Clerk, the County Surrogate (both elected for a five-year term) and the County Sheriff (elected for a three-year term). There are no term limits.

Shaun Golden has been the 76th Sheriff of Monmouth County since 2010.

Royal sheriffs (pre 1776)
Royal sheriffs during colonial era:

State of New Jersey (1776-1946)
The sheriffs were:

State of New Jersey (post-1947 constitution)

References

sheriffs
New Jersey, Monmouth